ÇOMÜ Medical School is part of Çanakkale Onsekiz Mart University in Çanakkale, Turkey.

Departments

See also
Çanakkale Onsekiz Mart University

External links
 Faculty of Medicine, ÇOMÜ, Faculty Website

Medicine
Medical schools in Turkey